Onomacritus (c. 530 – c. 480 BCE), also known as Onomacritos or Onomakritos, was a Greek chresmologue, or compiler of oracles, who lived at the court of the tyrant Pisistratus in Athens. He is said to have prepared an edition of the Homeric poems, and was an industrious collector, as well as a forger of old oracles and poems.

According to Herodotus
Herodotus reports that Onomacritus was hired by Pisistratus to compile the oracles of Musaeus, but that Onomacritus inserted forgeries of his own that were detected by Lasus of Hermione.  As a result, Onomacritus was banished from Athens by Pisistratus' son Hipparchus. After the flight of the Pisistratids to Persia, Onomacritus was reconciled with them. According to Herodotus, Onomacritus induced Xerxes I, the King of Persia, by his oracular responses, to decide upon his war with Greece.

According to Pausanias
Pausanias attributes to Onomacritus certain poems forged under the name of Musaeus. In explaining the presence of the Titan Anytos at Lycosura, he says that "From Homer the name of the Titans was taken by Onomakritos, who in the orgies he composed for Dionysos made the Titans the authors of the god's sufferings." Therefore, Onomacritus is responsible for inventing an important aspect of the mythology concerning the Titans.

According to Thomas Taylor 
The following are Thomas Taylor's remarks on works of Orpheus supposedly forged by Onomacritus:

Notes

References 

 Herodotus 7.6
 Pausanias 1.22.7, 8.37.5
 Harper's Dictionary of Classical Antiquities, by Harry Thurston Peck. New York. Harper and Brothers, 1898.
 Prolegomena to the Study of Greek Religion, by Jane Ellen Harrison, Cambridge, 1903.

Archaic Athens
Ancient Greek poets
Ancient Greek mythographers
Ancient Greek writers known only from secondary sources
Classical oracles
Archaic Greek seers
5th-century BC Greek people
6th-century BC poets
530s BC births
480s BC deaths
6th-century BC religious leaders
5th-century BC religious leaders